Electric Sound Stage was a radio station on iHeartRadio and Clear Channel HD2's across the United States that played commercial free electronic dance music 24/7.

The last broadcast of the station is thought to have been around April 2017 as its Facebook and Twitter pages have been offline since 3 March 2017. A new station, in partner with Insomniac, EDC Radio, is thought to be Electric Sound Stage's replacement as its launch occurred on 27 April.

History
Electric Sound Stage was launched on 2011. It was one of six Dance-formatted stations being offered by iHeartRadio, along with Club Phusion, Trancid, Pride Radio, The Spin*Cycle and Classic Dance.

Programming
Electric Sound Stage, like Trancid, offered an electronic dance music presentation, but with most of the schedule devoted to mix sets, specialty shows and programs concentrating on electronic/dance subgenres.

List of Radio Shows

External links
 ESS website
 ESS on Facebook
 ESS Radio Show Schedule

HD Radio
IHeartMedia
Electronic dance music radio stations